Qaşqaçay or Kashkachay may refer to:
Qaşqaçay, Dashkasan, Azerbaijan
Qaşqaçay, Qakh, Azerbaijan